António Ferreira (born 1970) is a Portuguese film director and producer. His nickname is "Toneca."

Biography

Ferreira was born in Coimbra, Portugal in 1970, where he lived most of his life. In 1991 he moved to Paris, returning one year later to the military service. After a short career as a computer programmer, in 1994 he entered film school in Lisbon (estc). In 1996 he moved to Berlin to study in the Film Academy of Berlin (dffb). In 1999 he shot his first film Breathing (under water), which was acclaimed by the critics and won several international prizes. In 2002 came his first feature film - Forget everything I've told you, which became one of the most successful films in Portugal that year. Currently he lives in Coimbra.

Filmography
 Pedro e Inês (2018)
 Posfácio nas Confecções Canhão (short) (2012)
Embargo (2010)
 Deus Não Quis (2007)
 Humanos - A vida em Variações (documentary) (2006)
 Esquece Tudo o Que Disse (2002)
 Respirar - Debaixo D'Água (2000)
 WC (1997)
 Gel Fatal (1996)

References

External links

 Deus Não Quis in Persona Non Grata
 Humanos - A vida em Variações in Persona Non Grata
 Esquece Tudo o Que Disse in Persona Non Grata
 Respirar - Debaixo D'Água in Persona Non Grata
 WC in Persona Non Grata
 Gel Fatal in Persona Non Grata

Living people
Portuguese film directors
1970 births
People from Coimbra